Kastriot Selman Islami (born August 18, 1952 in Tirana, Albania) is an Albanian politician. Formerly member of the Communist Party of Albania, turned moderate Socialist. He was Chairman of the Parliament of Albania from April 17, 1991 to April 6, 1992. On April 3, 1992, when the last communist president, Ramiz Alia resigned, Islami served as acting president for three days. During the presidency of Sali Berisha (1992–1997), Islami had no important positions in the government, but from 1997 to 2005 he was an important person in the government again holding several Ministerial positions in the Socialist "NANO government" . Most prominently he was foreign minister from 2003 to 2005, but lost his position in the cabinet when a new government was formed with Berisha as prime minister after the 2005 elections. He returned to Democratic Party on 7 May 2013 after he left the Socialist Party in March.

Islami has held the positions of:
 Member of the Parliament of Albania (1991–present)
 Minister of Education (1991)
 Chairman of the Parliament of Albania (1991–1992)
 Minister of State (1997–1998)
 Deputy Prime Minister (April 1998 – October 1998)
 Minister of Finance (February 2002 – December 2003)
 60th Minister of Foreign Affairs (December 12, 2003 – September 11, 2005)

References
 Political Parties in Albania 1912–2006, Tirana, 2007.

External links
Curriculum Vitae from the Ministry of Foreign Affairs of Albania

1952 births
Living people
Politicians from Tirana
Speakers of the Parliament of Albania
Members of the Parliament of Albania
Albanian physicists
Government ministers of Albania
Foreign ministers of Albania
Finance ministers of Albania
Albanian diplomats
Democratic Party of Albania politicians
21st-century Albanian politicians